This is a list of Italian football transfers for co-ownership resolutions, for the 2010–11 season, from and to Serie A and Serie B.

According to Article 102 bis of NOIF (Norme Organizzative Interne della F.I.G.C). The co-ownership deal must be confirmed each year. The deal may expired, renewed, bought back or sold outright. Deals that failed to form an agreement after the deadline, will be defined by auction between the 2 clubs. Which the club will submit their bid in a sealed envelope. Non-submission may lead to the rights is free to give to the opposite side. The mother club could sell their rights to third parties, likes Emiliano Viviano in the last year.

Co-ownership

See also
List of Italian football transfers summer 2010

References
General
 
 Result between 2009–10 Lega Pro clubs
Specific

External links

Italy
Trans
2010